Viu (also Romanized as Viu  and Viu) is a village in Khvoresh Rostam-e Jonubi Rural District, Khvoresh Rostam District, Khalkhal County, Ardabil Province, Iran. At the 2006 census, its population was 65, in 20 families.

References 

Tageo

Towns and villages in Khalkhal County